The year 1959 was marked by many events that left an imprint on the history of Soviet and Russian Fine Arts.

Events

 Solo Exhibition of works by Yaroslav Nikolaev was opened in the Leningrad Union of Artists.
 The traveling exhibition of works by Yuri Neprintsev shown in Leningrad, Moscow, Sverdlovsk, Gorky, Saratov.
 In Kaliningrad on the Kalinin square at the railway station is opened a bronze monument to Mikhail Kalinin, sculptor Boris Edunov.
 Solo Exhibition of works by Piotr Belousov was opened in the City painting gallery in the Vologda.
 The traveling exhibition of works by Leningrad artists opened in Murmansk. The participants included Irina Baldina, Vsevolod Bazhenov, Nikolai Galakhov, Alexei Eriomin, Mikhail Kaneev, Maya Kopitseva, Alexander Koroviakov, Gavriil Malish, Evsey Moiseenko, Boris Shamanov, Elena Skuin, Victor Teterin, Yuri Tulin and Vecheslav Zagonek.

Deaths
 May 26 — Vasiliy Kuchumov, Russian soviet painter and graphic artists (born 1888).
 November 3 — Fiodor Bogorodskiy, Russian soviet painter and graphic artists, Honored art worker of Russian Federation, Stalin Prize winner (born 1895).
 December 29 — Alexei Kokorekin, Russian soviet graphic artists, Honored art worker of Russian Federation, Stalin Prize winner (born 1906).

Gallery of 1959

See also
 List of Russian artists
 List of painters of Leningrad Union of Artists
 Saint Petersburg Union of Artists
 Russian culture
 1959 in the Soviet Union

References

Sources
 Творчество самодеятельных художников Ленинграда. Каталог. Л., Художник РСФСР, 1959.
 Ивенский С. Петр Петрович Белоусов. Л., Художник РСФСР, 1959.
 Передвижная выставка произведений ленинградских художников. Каталог. Л., Художник РСФСР, 1959.
 Artists of Peoples of the USSR. Biography Dictionary. Vol. 1. Moscow, Iskusstvo, 1970.
 Artists of Peoples of the USSR. Biography Dictionary. Vol. 2. Moscow, Iskusstvo, 1972.
 Directory of Members of Union of Artists of USSR. Volume 1,2. Moscow, Soviet Artist Edition, 1979.
 Directory of Members of the Leningrad branch of the Union of Artists of Russian Federation. Leningrad, Khudozhnik RSFSR, 1980.
 Artists of Peoples of the USSR. Biography Dictionary. Vol. 4 Book 1. Moscow, Iskusstvo, 1983.
 Directory of Members of the Leningrad branch of the Union of Artists of Russian Federation. - Leningrad: Khudozhnik RSFSR, 1987.
 Artists of peoples of the USSR. Biography Dictionary. Vol. 4 Book 2. - Saint Petersburg: Academic project humanitarian agency, 1995.
 Link of Times: 1932 - 1997. Artists - Members of Saint Petersburg Union of Artists of Russia. Exhibition catalogue. - Saint Petersburg: Manezh Central Exhibition Hall, 1997.
 Matthew C. Bown. Dictionary of 20th Century Russian and Soviet Painters 1900-1980s. London, Izomar, 1998.
 Vern G. Swanson. Soviet Impressionism. Woodbridge, England, Antique Collectors' Club, 2001.
 Время перемен. Искусство 1960—1985 в Советском Союзе. СПб., Государственный Русский музей, 2006.
 Sergei V. Ivanov. Unknown Socialist Realism. The Leningrad School. Saint-Petersburg, NP-Print Edition, 2007. , .
 Anniversary Directory graduates of Saint Petersburg State Academic Institute of Painting, Sculpture, and Architecture named after Ilya Repin, Russian Academy of Arts. 1915 - 2005. Saint Petersburg: Pervotsvet Publishing House, 2007.

Art
Soviet Union